Maskowski District is an administrative subdivision of the city of Minsk, Belarus. It was named after the city of Moscow.

Geography
The district is situated in central and south-western area of the city and borders with Frunzyenski, Tsentralny, Leninsky and Kastrychnitski districts.

Transport
Maskowski is served by the subway and tram networks. It is also crossed by the MKAD beltway.

See also
Independence Square, Minsk

References

External links
 Maskowski District official website
 Maskowski District on Minsk website

Districts of Minsk